Aubigny-aux-Kaisnes is a commune in the department of Aisne in the Hauts-de-France region of northern France.

Geography
Aubigny-aux-Kaisnes is located some 15 km southwest of Saint-Quentin and 5 km northeast of Ham. It can be accessed by road D930 which runs northeast from Ham and inside the northwestern border of the commune towards Saint-Quentin. The D34 road also comes from Foreste in the northwest through the village and continuing to Bray-Saint-Christophe in the east. There is also a country road heading west from the village to Villers-Saint-Christophe. The commune consists entirely of farmland with no other villages or hamlets.

Neighbouring communes and villages

Administration

List of Successive Mayors of Aubigny-aux-Kaisnes

Population

Notable people linked to the commune
Augustin Ringeval, racing cyclist who participated in the Tour de France from 1905 to 1913. Born on 13 April 1882 in Aubigny-aux-Kaisnes, he died aged 85 in Amélie-les-Bains on 5 July 1967

See also
Communes of the Aisne department

References

External links
Aubigny-aux-Kaisnes on the old IGN website 
Bell Towers website 
Aubigny-aux-Kaisnes on Géoportail, National Geographic Institute (IGN) website 
Aubigny aux Quesnes on the 1750 Cassini Map

Communes of Aisne